Trimium brevicorne is a species of ant-loving beetle in the family Staphylinidae. It is found in Europe and Northern Asia (excluding China) and North America.

References

Further reading

External links

 

Pselaphinae
Articles created by Qbugbot
Beetles described in 1816